Daniel E. Sutherland is an American historian who has written books about 19th century America. He wrote a book titled The Confederate Carpetbaggers about southerners who moved north after the American Civil War.

He was part of a panel discussion on "The Civil War West of the Mississippi", broadcast on August 10, 2012 on C-SPAN. On November 2, 1997, The New York Times published "Southern Fortitude", his review of The Confederate War, by Gary W. Gallagher.

Writings
The Emergence of Total War, edited by Grady McWhiney. Fort Worth, Texas: Ryan Place Publishers (1996)
Fredericksburg and Chancellorsville: The Dare Mark Campaign. University of Nebraska Press (1998)
Guerrillas, Unionists, and Violence on the Confederate Home Front. University of Arkansas Press (1999)
The Confederate Carpetbaggers. Louisiana State University Press (1988)
A Savage Conflict: The Decisive Role of Guerrillas in the American Civil War. University of North Carolina Press (2009)
Whistler: A Life for Art's Sake. New Haven: Yale University Press (2014), about artist James McNeill Whistler
Whistler's Mother: Portrait of an Extraordinary Life (coauthored with Georgia Toutziari). New Haven: Yale University Press (2018)

References

Living people
1946 births
University of Arkansas faculty
Historians of the American Civil War
20th-century American historians
21st-century American historians
American military historians
American male biographers
Biographers of artists
20th-century American biographers
21st-century American biographers